Lucie Blanquies was a woman scientist who worked in Madame Curie's laboratory in Paris from 1908 to 1910.  She measured the power of the alpha particles emitted by different radioactive materials.

References

20th-century French women scientists
Nuclear chemists
French women chemists